For Children is a cycle of short piano pieces composed by Béla Bartók. The collection was originally started in 1908 and completed in 1909, and comprised 85 pieces which were issued in four volumes. Each piece is based on a folk tune, Hungarian in the first two volumes (42 pieces), and Slovak in the last two (43 pieces). In 1945, Bartók revised the set, removing six pieces which used tunes which had been inaccurately transcribed or found not to be original folk tunes, and substantially changing the harmonization of a number of others; the collection, now of 79 pieces, was reissued in two volumes (of 40 and 39 pieces).

The pieces were written for students to play, and progress slightly in difficulty through each half of the collection. In modern times, some concert pianists (notably Zoltán Kocsis) have begun including some of them on their recital programs, citing their musical value even apart from their pedagogical origins.

Contents 

The final, revised version of For Children is divided into two volumes:

Volume I

Volume II

See also
Mikrokosmos
 An interactive score of Bartók’s For Children no. 25 with Sir András Schiff.
 An interactive score of Bartók’s For Children no. 31 with Sir András Schiff.
 An interactive score of Bartók’s For Children no. 35 with Sir András Schiff.

Hungarian music
Compositions for solo piano
Compositions by Béla Bartók